Kerawara is island in Duke of York Islands archipelago  in Papua New Guinea.

Geography 
The land of Kerawara Island is flat.  The highest point on the island is 23 meters above sea level.  It covers 1,0 km from the north to the south and 1.7 km from the east to the west. In total island covers about  0.84  square kilometers.

References

Islands of Papua New Guinea
Islands Region (Papua New Guinea)